The 1999–2000 season was Heart of Midlothian F.C.s 17th consecutive season in the top level of Scottish football, playing in the Scottish Premier League. Hearts also competed in the Scottish Cup and League Cup.

Players

First-team squad
Squad at end of season

Left club during season

Fixtures

Pre-season friendlies

League Cup

Scottish Cup

Scottish Premier League

Final league table

Statistics

Scorers

See also
List of Heart of Midlothian F.C. seasons

References

Notes

External links
 Official Club website
 Complete Statistical Record

1999-00
Heart of Midlothian